Cassida circumdata is a species of tortoise beetle in the family Chrysomelidae. It is found in Indomalaya and the South Pacific islands.

Biology
The incubation period is about 2 to 6 days. Grub undergoes five larval instars. Pre-pupal period is about 4 days, where it later undergo 5 to 7 days of pupal stage. In captivity, the life cycle completed from 38 to 70 days.

The species is often used in biological control of harm plants of Convolvulaceae in the field.

References

Further reading

External links

 

Cassidinae
Beetles described in 1799